The first season of Painted with Raven premiered on November 25, 2021, and concluded on January 13, 2022. The competition was broadcast on WOW Presents Plus. The competition saw seven makeup artists compete for a cash prize of $25,000.

Contestants 
Ages, names, and cities stated are at time of filming.

Contestants progress
Legend:

Episodes

References 

2021 American television seasons
2022 American television seasons
WOW Presents Plus original programming
Painted with Raven